Christian Harrison (born May 29, 1994) is an American professional tennis player. He has a career-high ranking of world No. 198 achieved on 2 July 2018 and a doubles ranking of world No. 162 achieved on 26 August 2013. He is the younger brother of Ryan Harrison.

Early life
Christian was coached by his father, Pat Harrison, and attended the IMG Academy in Bradenton, Florida.

Professional career

2012: Grand Slam doubles debut and quarterfinal
In July, Christian made it to the quarterfinals of the Lexington, Kentucky Challenger event. 
Christian was awarded a wildcard into the 2012 US Open to play doubles alongside Ryan Harrison, where they reached the quarterfinals.

2013
Earlier in the year he reached the quarterfinals, semifinals, the final, and won, respectively, the four Futures events in which he participated. He failed to qualify in Indian Wells, losing in the first round of qualifying to Ernests Gulbis, who made a deep run to the fourth round after qualifying. However, he did take a set off Gulbis. Harrison won his first ATP World Tour match against Alejandro Falla at the BB&T Atlanta Open. He then lost in the next round to John Isner in three tight sets.

2014–15
Harrison spent 2014 and 2015 recovering from several surgeries.

2016-2018: Grand Slam singles and Masters 1000 debut
Harrison reached the final round of qualifying at the 2016 US Open after beating Luke Saville and second seed Konstantin Kravchuk in two three-set matches. He made it into main draw after beating Steven Diez also in three-set match. He was one set down at all three matches in qualifying. He lost in the first round to Paul-Henri Mathieu in straight sets.

He made his Masters 1000 debut at the 2017 Miami Open.

2021: Maiden ATP doubles final
Harrison qualified for the 2021 Delray Beach Open, starting the week ranked No. 789 in the world. He beat number 1 seed Cristian Garín and advanced all the way to the semifinals, where he was defeated by fourth seed Hubert Hurkacz, who would later win the title. As a result he climbed 444 positions in the rankings to a World No. 345 ranking on 18 January 2021 and he got five ATP Tour match victories thus far, with three of them in Delray Beach, where he also won two matches in qualifying. He also reached his maiden ATP final in doubles with his brother Ryan Harrison where they lost to Ariel Behar and Gonzalo Escobar. As a result he returned to the top 250 in the doubles rankings at World No. 229.

2022: First Wimbledon qualification since 2018 and win
He qualified for only the second time at the 2022 Wimbledon Championships and his third Major main draw and won his first match at any Major, defeating wildcard Jay Clarke.

ATP career finals

Doubles: 1 (1 runner-up)

ATP Challenger and ITF Futures/World Tennis Tour Finals

Singles: 10 (5–5)

Doubles: 10 (6–4)

Performance timeline

Singles
Current through the 2022 Wimbledon Championships.

World TeamTennis

Christian has played three seasons with World TeamTennis, making his debut in 2015 with the Boston Lobsters as a substitute. He has since served as a substitute for the Orange County Breakers in 2018 and the San Diego Aviators during the 2020 WTT season played at The Greenbrier.

References

External links
 
 

1994 births
American male tennis players
Living people
Sportspeople from Bradenton, Florida
Sportspeople from Shreveport, Louisiana
Tennis people from Florida
Tennis people from Louisiana